The EuroLeague Magic Moment of the Season is the annual award for the European top-tier level EuroLeague's "most spectacular play of the season". The award is also known as the 7DAYS EuroLeague Magic Moment of the Season, for name sponsorship reasons. The award began in the 2016–17 season.

The winner of the award is selected by an online vote of the fans.

Magic Moment winners

References

External links
 EuroLeague Official Web Page
 InterBasket EuroLeague Basketball Forum
 TalkBasket EuroLeague Basketball Forum
 

Magic Moment